Isabelle Howell (born 22 February 2000) is a Welsh field hockey player.

Career

Club level
In club competition, Howell plays for Zehlendorfer Wespen in the German Bundesliga.

National teams

Under–21
Isabelle Howell made her debut for the Welsh U–21 team in 2019. She was a co-captain of the team at the EuroHockey Junior Championship II in Alanya.

In 2022 she was named as captain of the junior side for the FIH Junior World Cup in Potchefstroom.

Senior national team
Howell made her debut for the senior national team in 2018. She was a member of the team at the XXI Commonwealth Games in the Gold Coast.

She has since gone on to represent the team in many international competitions. In 2019 she appeared at the FIH Series Finals in Valencia, as well as the EuroHockey Championship II in Glasgow.

In 2021 she appeared at her second EuroHockey Championship II in Prague.

References

External links
 
 

2000 births
Living people
Welsh female field hockey players
British female field hockey players
Female field hockey midfielders